Born is the first album released by the classical crossover string quartet Bond, and was produced by Magnus Fiennes and Gareth Cousins. The album was a worldwide success, reaching the top twenty in charts across Europe. The album reached number 16 in the UK charts, spending six weeks in the top 40, and was also number one in the UK Classical charts, but it was subsequently removed from these charts for not meeting all the 'rules' of classical music.

The album was re-released in 2001 with an additional track.

Track listing
"Quixote" (Magnus Fiennes) – 4:44
"Winter" (Yoad Nevo) – 5:42
"Victory" (Tonči Huljić) – 4:40
"Oceanic" Magnus Fiennes – 6:42
"Kismet" (Gay-Yee Westerhoff) – 5:12
"Korobushka" (Traditional, arr. Magnus Fiennes and Brian Gascoigne) – 4:48
"Alexander the Great" (Tonči Huljić) – 2:57
"Duel" (Tonči Huljić) – 4:20
"Bella Donna" (Eos Chater) – 3:15
"The 1812" (Tchaikovsky, arr. *Gareth Cousins & Julian Kershaw) – 6:37
"Dalalai" (Tonči Huljić) – 4:06
"Hymn" (Magnus Fiennes) – 4:50
"Victory" (Mike Batt Mix) (Tonči Huljić) – 3:25

The 2001 release also contained:
"Viva!" (Vivaldi, arr. Del!) – 3:14

In addition track 2 had been renamed "Wintersun", shortened to 3:26 and had an additional writing credit to Gil Brown.

Charts and certifications

Weekly charts

Year-end charts

Certifications

References

External links
Bond's official website
Record label

2000 debut albums
Bond (band) albums
Decca Records albums